Demi Patricia Singleton (born 27 February 2007) is an American actress, singer, and dancer. She is best known for her role in crime TV series Godfather of Harlem and as the young Serena Williams in the biographical film King Richard.

Early life 
Born in Baton Rouge, Singleton's family is from the Central American country of Honduras and the West Indian island of Dominica. She initially lived in New Orleans, and moved to New York City at the age of three. She began training in the arts with New York's finest teachers in music, dance and acting. She has studied classical ballet since the age of three and began playing the cello when she was four. She studied at a rigorous music conservatory for children in Brooklyn for 6 years where she learned to play instruments by ear through the Suzuki method. At nine, she attended a Broadway musical featuring child performers and decided that she also wanted to pursue a career as a stage performer.

Career 
Singleton began acting in 2017, and made her Broadway debut in Andrew Lloyd Webber's School of Rock at ten years old, performing for nearly a year before joining Disney's The Lion King on Broadway as young Nala.

In September 2018, Singleton was cast in the Epix crime drama, Godfather of Harlem, led by Academy Award winner Forest Whitaker, as his character's granddaughter Margaret Johnson.

In 2020, Singleton was cast to star as Serena Williams in the Will Smith-led Warner Bros. sports drama King Richard, which tells the story of how Serena and Venus Williams rose to success from the planning and coaching of their father, Richard Williams. The film was finally released in November 2021. She also portrayed young Serena Williams in the 2019 Bumble Super Bowl commercial.

Filmography

Film

Television

Theater

Awards and nominations

References

External links 

 
 
 

2007 births
American actresses
Garifuna people
Living people
American people of Honduran descent
American people of Dominica descent